The Avenged Sevenfold Tour was a concert tour by American heavy metal band Avenged Sevenfold between 2007 and 2009, promoting their album Avenged Sevenfold. It was the band's last tour with the drummer Jimmy "The Rev" Sullivan who died on December 28, 2009.

The tour began on October 29, 2007, with a North American leg, shortly after the band finished its previous tour in support of City of Evil. The tour ended on August 2, 2009, at the Sonisphere Festival in Knebworth, England.

During the band's North American leg in autumn 2008, after a show on September 6, 2008, the vocalist M. Shadows had difficulties singing, and flew to see his doctor, cancelling the Baltimore show the next day. The whole co-headlining tour with Buckcherry was then cancelled because of Shadows' case of vocal fatigue. The band resumed the tour after Shadows took some rest, with a short Japanese leg starting on October 15, 2008, and then on November 4, 2008, the band rescheduled its cancelled North American leg and played through November and December a co-headlining tour with Buckcherry and the support acts Shinedown and Saving Abel, in place of the cancelled tour.

The summer leg 2008 was as an opening act for Iron Maiden. The band also played three dates in June 2009, in support of Metallica.

During the band's headlining of the North American Taste of Chaos 2008 tour, it recorded the April 10, 2008, performance, for its first live DVD, entitled Live in the LBC & Diamonds in the Rough, which was a bundle of a live DVD, and a CD of B-sides and unreleased tracks from the Avenged Sevenfold album.

On the 16th of April 2009, Guns N' Roses guitarist Slash joined the band on stage to play a cover version of the Guns N' Roses song "It's So Easy".

Set list

Tour dates

Personnel
M. Shadows – lead vocals, organ on "Critical Acclaim"
Zacky Vengeance – rhythm guitar, acoustic guitar, backing vocals
The Rev – drums, percussion, backing vocals, co-lead vocals
Synyster Gates – lead guitar, backing vocals
Johnny Christ – bass guitar, backing vocals

References

2007 concert tours
2008 concert tours
2009 concert tours
Avenged Sevenfold